Raquel Kops-Jones and Bethanie Mattek-Sands were the defending champions, but Mattek-Sands chose not to participate this year.Kops-Jones partnered up with Sarah Borwell, but they lost in the quarterfinals against Cara Black and Yan Zi.
Virginia Ruano Pascual and Meghann Shaughnessy won in the final 6–3, 6–4 against Black and Yan.

Seeds

Draw

Main draw

References
Main Draw

2010 Polsat Warsaw Open Doubles
Polsat Warsaw Open Doubles